Dark Honeymoon is a 2008 thriller film, starring Lindy Booth, Nick Cornish, Tia Carrere, Daryl Hannah, Roy Scheider and Eric Roberts. It was directed by David O'Malley and released direct-to-video on July 22, 2008.

Plot
After a brief courtship, a man marries an enchanting woman, and then things begin to go terribly wrong. During their honeymoon on the foggy Oregon coast, he discovers her shocking secrets as those around them begin to die horrible and violent deaths, one by one. He soon learns that you really don't know someone until you marry them.

Cast
 Lindy Booth as Kathryn
 Nick Cornish as Paul
 Roy Scheider as Sam
 Tia Carrere as Miranda 
 Daryl Hannah as Jan
 Eric Roberts as L.A. Guy
 Wes Ramsey as Jay
 Robert R. Shafer as Sheriff Fields

Production
Shooting began May 2006 in Cambria, California. The DVD was released on July 22, 2008.

According to industry sources, new footage was shot for "Dark Honeymoon" without the input, permission or knowledge of the writer/director, a motion picture veteran named David O'Malley. The film was then re-edited, drastically changing the original story, characters and intent of the movie. As a result, O'Malley reportedly disavowed the film and replaced his name with a pseudonym.

References

External links
 

2008 films
2008 thriller films
Films set in Oregon
American thriller films
2000s English-language films
Films directed by David O'Malley
2000s American films